Papuloerythroderma of Ofuji is a rare disorder most commonly found in Japan, characterized by pruritic papules that spare the skinfolds, producing bands of uninvolved cutis, creating the so-called deck-chair sign. Frequently there is associated blood eosinophilia.  Skin biopsies reveal a dense lymphohistiocytic infiltrate, eosinophils in the papillary dermis, and increased Langerhans cells (S-100 positive). Systemic steroids are the treatment of choice and may result in long-term remissions.

It was characterized in 1984.

Use of PUVA in treatment has been described.

See also 
 Pruritus
 List of cutaneous conditions
 Erythroderma

References

External links 

Eosinophilic cutaneous conditions